Queen Elizabeth II became Head of the Commonwealth upon the death of her father, King George VI, on 6 February 1952 and remained Head of the Commonwealth until her death on 8 September 2022. During that time, she toured the Commonwealth of Nations widely. She visited all member states except for Cameroon, and the three most recently joined member states, Rwanda, Togo and Gabon. Her first foreign tour was before her accession when she accompanied her parents to the countries of Southern Africa in 1947.

Tours of the British Islands are excluded from the list below.

1950s

1960s

1970s

1980s

1990s

2000s

2010s

Commonwealth countries and territories never visited by Elizabeth II

See also
 List of state visits made by Elizabeth II
 List of state and official visits by Canada
 Royal tours of Australia
 Royal tours of Canada
List of official overseas trips made by Charles III
List of official overseas trips made by the Prince and Princess of Wales

References

Elizabeth II, Commonwealth
Commonwealth visits
Elizabeth II, Commonwealth
Elizabeth II, Commonwealth
Elizabeth II
20th century-related lists
Lists of 21st-century trips
20th century in international relations
21st century in international relations